Thiruvottriyur Theradi Metro station (formerly Gowri Ashram Metro Station) is a Metro railway station on Line 1 Extension of the Chennai Metro. The station is one of the 26 stations along the Blue Line (Chennai Metro) of the Chennai Metro. The station will serve the neighbourhoods of Thiruvottriyur and other northern suburbs of Chennai. This station was innagurated along with Wimco Nagar Depot Metro Station on March 14, 2022.

History
The station was still under construction during the inaugurated of the northern extension of Blue line of Phase I on 14 February 2021, so the stretch opened with other stations. The station is expected to be completed by January 2022. During the Construction of this station metro trains skips this station. This station was inaugurated along with wimco nagar depot metro station on March 14, 2022

The station

Structure
Thiruvottriyur Theradi is an elevated Metro station situated on the Blue Line (Chennai Metro). It is located in the neighbourhood of the same name.

Station layout

See also
 Chennai
 List of Chennai metro stations
 Railway stations in Chennai

References

External links
 

 UrbanRail.Net – descriptions of all metro systems in the world, each with a schematic map showing all stations.

Chennai Metro stations
Railway stations in Chennai